Cyanostegia is a genus of plants in the family Lamiaceae, first described in 1849. The entire genus is endemic to Australia.

Species
 Cyanostegia angustifolia Turcz.  - Western Australia
 Cyanostegia corifolia Munir - Western Australia
 Cyanostegia cyanocalyx (F.Muell.) C.A.Gardner - northern Western Australia, southern Northern Territory
 Cyanostegia lanceolata Turcz.  - Western Australia
 Cyanostegia microphylla S.Moore - Western Australia

References

Lamiaceae
Lamiaceae genera
Endemic flora of Australia
Taxa named by Nikolai Turczaninow